Flute sonata in E minor may refer to:

 Flute sonata in E minor (HWV 375)
 Flute sonata in E minor (HWV 359b)
 Flute sonata in E minor (HWV 379)